Acid Pro (often stylized ACID) is a professional digital audio workstation (DAW) software program currently developed by Magix Software. It was originally called Acid pH1 and published by Sonic Foundry, later by Sony Creative Software as Acid Pro, and since spring 2018 by Magix as both Acid Pro and a simplified version, Acid Music Studio.  Acid Pro 8 (the current version ) supports 32-bit and 64-bit architectures, and has MIDI, ASIO, VST, VST3, DirectX Audio, and 5.1 surround sound support.

History 
Acid was first launched in 1998, as Acid pH1, by Sonic Foundry in Madison, Wisconsin. It was a loop-based music sequencer, in which Acid Loop files could be simply drag-and-dropped then automatically adjust to the tempo and key of a song with virtually no sonic degradation.

A website for budding musicians using Acid technology was set up, named AcidPlanet.com. The software became very popular in the late 1990s and early 2000s among composers, producers, and DJs interested in quickly creating beats, music textures, or complete compositions and orchestrations, that would work with virtually any tempo or key signature.

Sonic Foundry sold its Acid, Vegas, Sound Forge, CD Architect, Siren, VideoFactory, ScreenBlast, and Batch Converter product lines to Sony Pictures Digital in July 2003; the merger resulted in the new Sony Creative Software division.  Sony's Acid Pro 6 (released in the third quarter of 2006) introduced a full-digital audio workstation that also included MIDI and multitrack audio recording with full support for ASIO computer-audio and VST synthesizer-plugin standards.

On May 20, 2016, German company Magix Software GmbH announced they had acquired the majority of the products in the Sony Creative Software portfolio. These include Acid Pro, Vegas Pro, Movie Studio, and Sound Forge Pro.  Acid Pro 8, the first version since Magix's acquisition, was announced on January 21, 2018 and released in spring 2018. The update came with new modern features including an enhanced interface, support for 64-bit, additional samples, VST3 support, over 20 DirectX audio effects, the ability to mix in 5.1 surround sound, and new features named Media Manager, BeatMapper, and Chopper.

In one version or another, Acid Pro runs on PCs with all versions of Microsoft Windows since Windows 2000; Acid Pro 8 requires Windows 8.1 or later.  Versions do not exist for macOS or Linux.

Acid Loops 
Acid Loop (trademark), also Acidized or Acidified loop (generic terms), refers to a sound clip which can be repeated and transposed to form a song with minimal manual adjustment. Acidized loops contain tempo and key information, so that Acid can properly time-stretch and pitch-shift the clip to fit into an existing track structure. An Acidized loop is a specially prepared WAV audio file, which can be created using an audio-editing tool such as Sound Forge. 

The technology was created in 1998 for Sonic Foundry's original Acid pH1 software. Sony and Magix later sold series of Acidized loop sample CDs to be used with Acid Pro, as have various third-party companies. Since then, this looping technique has been adopted by the majority of other digital audio workstations on the market, sometimes with competing brand names for the feature, such as Cakewalk Sonar (calling it Groove Clips), and Cubase (calling it Audio Warp). Many DAWs can also directly support Acidized loops intended for use in Acid Pro.

Notable users
 Halley Labs

Other versions
 Acid Music Studio is a simplified, lower-cost version of Acid Pro. The latest version  is Acid Music Studio 11.

See also

 List of digital audio workstation software
 Comparison of digital audio editors
 List of music software
 Magix Music Maker

References

External links
 Official website
 Official website since 2016
 ACID Tutorial (archive.org)
 ACID Tutorial (magix.com)
 Comparison of implementations

1998 software
Digital audio workstation software
Magix software
Windows multimedia software